Munster Senior Cup may refer to:

 Munster Senior Cup (association football)  
 Munster Senior Cup (rugby union)
 Munster Schools Rugby Senior Cup